The 2015 Case Western Reserve Spartans football team represented Case Western Reserve University as a member of the Presidents' Athletic Conference (PAC) during the 2015 NCAA Division III football season. Led by 12th-year head coach Greg Debeljak, the Spartans compiled an overall record of 7–3 with a mark of 6–2 in conference play, tying for third place in the PAC. Case Western Reserved played home games at DiSanto Field in Cleveland.

Schedule

References

Case Western Reserve
Case Western Reserve Spartans football seasons
Case Western Reserve Spartans football